The Roue's Heart is a 1909 American silent short drama film directed by D. W. Griffith.

Cast
 Harry Solter as Monsieur Flamant
 Linda Arvidson as Noblewoman / Sculptress's Friend
 John R. Cumpson as Nobleman
 Adele DeGarde as Sculptress's Model
 Gladys Egan as Child
 Anita Hendrie as Noblewoman
 Charles Inslee as Nobleman
 Arthur V. Johnson as Nobleman / Servant
 Florence Lawrence as Noblewoman
 Marion Leonard as Sculptress
 David Miles as Nobleman (unconfirmed)
 Owen Moore as Nobleman
 Barry O'Moore as Nobleman (as Herbert Yost)
 Mack Sennett as Servant
 Dorothy West as Sculptress's Friend

References

External links
 

1909 films
1909 drama films
1909 short films
Silent American drama films
American silent short films
American black-and-white films
Films directed by D. W. Griffith
1900s American films